Hawley is an extinct town in Wright County, in the U.S. state of Missouri.

The community was located south of Missouri Route N approximately 5.5 miles northwest of Mountain Grove. Whetstone Creek flows past the west side of the location.

A post office called Hawley was established in 1883, and remained in operation until 1906. The community has the name of the local Hawley family.

References

Ghost towns in Missouri
Former populated places in Wright County, Missouri